Torger Ødegaard (born 5 December 1966) is a Norwegian politician for the Conservative Party.

He holds a cand.mag. degree from the University of Oslo. He has worked as director of information in Stor-Oslo Lokaltrafikk, and as a secretary for city government leader Fritz Huitfeldt. From 2001 he was Commissioner (byråd) of Culture and Education in the city government of Oslo. He resigned in 2014 to become managing director of the Lovisenberg Hospital.

References

1966 births
Living people
Conservative Party (Norway) politicians
Politicians from Oslo